Pollio may refer to:
 Marcus Vitruvius Pollio, Roman architect usually known as Vitruvius
 Gaius Asinius Pollio, Roman historian and orator
 Gaius Asinius Pollio (consul 23), grandson of the preceding
 Rufrius Pollio,  Roman Prefect of the Praetorian Guard
 Vitrasius Pollio (died AD 32) Roman member of the equestrian class
 Abtalion, a leading rabbi in the 1st century BC, known as Pollion in Greek and Pollio in Latin 
 Vedius Pollio, friend of Roman emperor Augustus
 Pollio of Cybalae, 3rd-century Christian martyr
 Alberto Pollio (1852–1914), Italian general and Chief of Staff of the Italian army
 Claudio Pollio (born 1958), Italian Olympic champion wrestler
 Marty Pollio (born 1955), American comedian and actor
 Mike Pollio (born 1943), American former basketball coach and college athletics administrator
 Silvio Pollio, director of the 2003 crime film How It All Went Down

See also
 Polio (disambiguation)